The Last Word with Lawrence O'Donnell is an American weeknight news and political commentary program on MSNBC. The program airs live at 10:00 P.M. Eastern Time Monday-Friday, and is hosted by Lawrence O'Donnell from Mondays to Thursdays and relief presenters on Fridays. O'Donnell is described by MSNBC as "providing the last word on the biggest issues and most compelling stories of the day."

The show originally premiered in the 10 pm slot Monday-Thursday on September 27, 2010, with the first episode featuring Vice President Joe Biden and Countdown host Keith Olbermann. The show was moved to the 8 pm slot in January 2011 when Olbermann's show was canceled. Last Word returned to its original 10 pm slot in October 2011.

During the 2022 United States elections, The Last Word was temporarily replaced on Fridays with The Kornacki Countdown hosted by Steve Kornacki during the 2022 midterm elections from October 14 to Election Day November 8.

Guest hosts for the series include Ali Velshi, Katie Phang, Jonathan Capehart, and Alicia Menendez.

Replays of the show are available on MSNBC's app (accessible from the US only). The show is also available as an audio podcast.

Reception
YouGov, a British international Internet-based market research and data analytics firm, collected 1550 interviews' worth of data between July 2020 and October 2020, and concluded: "The Last Word with Lawrence O'Donnell is the 384th most popular contemporary TV show and the 407th most famous. The Last Word with Lawrence O'Donnell is described by fans as: Smart, Helpful, Never miss it, Intelligent and Fair." It collated the ratings of American views: 
 21%  POSITIVE opinion
 12%  NEGATIVE opinion
 14%  NEUTRAL opinion
 47%  HAVE HEARD OF
YouGov's other findings:
 "The Last Word with Lawrence O'Donnell" is more popular among Baby Boomers than among other age groups.
 "With 23% positive opinion, The Last Word with Lawrence O'Donnell is more popular among Men than among Women."

Notable guests
Joe Biden, President of the United States from Vice President of the United States, appeared on September 27, 2010
Charlie Crist, Member of the United States House of Representatives from Florida's 13th congressional district Florida governor, Independent candidate for U.S. Senate from Florida in 2010, appeared on September 28, 2010
Levi Johnston, Candidate for mayor of Wasilla, Alaska in 2011, appeared on September 28, 2010
Michael Steele, Chairman of the Republican National Committee, appeared on October 5, 2010.
Howard Dean, former Chairman of the Democratic National Committee and former Governor of Vermont, appeared October 5, 2010.
Ron Paul, former Republican Congressman of Texas's 14th congressional district, appeared October 11, 2010.
Valerie Plame, former CIA operative, and husband Joe Wilson appeared on October 19, 2010.
Nancy Pelosi, Speaker of the House of Representatives
Mary L. Trump, psychologist, author, and niece of Donald Trump, appeared September 17, 2020.
Mark Kelly, United States Senator from Arizona, appeared October 5, 2022.
Condoleezza Rice, United States Secretary of State, appeared in 2011.

References

External links

 

MSNBC original programming
2010 American television series debuts
2010s American television news shows
2020s American television news shows
English-language television shows